This is a timeline documenting the events of heavy metal in the year 2019.

Bands formed
 BPMD
 Nemophila

Bands disbanded
 Black Moth
 Brain Drill
 Children of Bodom
 Continents
 Dirge
 Huldre
 Katedra
 Nitro
 Prophets of Rage
 Slayer
 Unsane

Bands reformed
 Agent Steel
 Alcatrazz
 Brand New Sin (one-off show)
 Cadaver
 Dirty Looks
 Dismember
 Katatonia
Mercyful Fate
 Methods of Mayhem
 Mr. Bungle
 Rage Against the Machine
 Sev (one-off show)
 Sister Sin
 Sylosis
 Vio-lence

Events
 After 51 years together, UFO embarks on their final tour, dubbed "The Last Orders", with founding member Phil Mogg, who plans to retire from the band.
 After 46 years together, Kiss embarks on yet another farewell tour, dubbed "One Last Kiss: End of the Road World Tour".
 After 45 years together, Krokus embarks on their farewell tour this year.
 Slayer is expected to wrap up their farewell tour this year in November.
 Megadeth launches its first-ever MegaCruise, which is set to take place in the Pacific Ocean from October 13‒19.
 Accept announces that Martin Motnik is replacing original bassist Peter Baltes, who left the band the previous November.
 Janet Gardner of Vixen leaves to focus on her solo career. She is replaced by Femme Fatale's Lorraine Lewis.
 Longtime percussionist Chris Fehn of Slipknot departs from the band. This comes after Fehn filed a lawsuit against the band citing withheld payments. His replacement has yet to be revealed.

Deaths
 January 1 – Shane Bisnett, former bassist of Ice Nine Kills, died from undisclosed reasons at the age of 31.
 January 16 – Brian Velasco, drummer of Razorback, died from suicide by jumping from the balcony of a condominium.
 January 19 – Ted McKenna, former drummer of Michael Schenker Group and Ian Gillan, died from hemorrhage after hernia surgery at the age of 68.
 January 25 – Bruce Corbitt, vocalist of Rigor Mortis, died from esophageal cancer at the age of 56.
 January 28 – Paul Whaley, drummer of Blue Cheer, died from heart failure at the age of 72.
 March 17 – Bernie Tormé, former guitarist of Ozzy Osbourne and Gillan, died from post-flu complications at the age of 66.
 March 17 – Yuya Uchida, former percussionist and producer of Flower Travellin' Band, died from pneumonia at the age of 79.
 April 13 – Paul Raymond, keyboardist and guitarist of UFO and Michael Schenker Group, died from a heart attack at the age of 73.
 April 26 – Phil McCormack, vocalist of Molly Hatchet, died from undisclosed reasons at the age of 58.
 June 8 – Andre Matos, vocalist of Angra, Shaman and Viper, died from a heart attack at the age of 47.
 June 13 – Nature Ganganbaigal, vocalist and multi-instrumentalist of Tengger Cavalry, died from undisclosed reasons at the age of 29.
 August 4 – Paul Finnie, former bassist of Power Quest, died from a heart attack at the age of 44.
 August 5 – Lizzie Grey, vocalist and guitarist of Spiders & Snakes and former guitarist of London, died from Lewy Body disease at the age of 60.
 September 16 – Mick Schauer, former keyboardist of Clutch, died from undisclosed reasons.
 September 18 – Tony Mills, former vocalist of TNT and Shy, died from pancreatic cancer at the age of 57.
 September 19 – Larry Wallis, former guitarist of Motörhead, died from undisclosed reasons at the age of 70.
 September 23 – Richard Brunelle, former guitarist of Morbid Angel, died from undisclosed reasons at the age of 55.
 October 2 – Morten Stützer, guitarist and former bassist of Artillery, died from undisclosed reasons at the age of 57.
 October 21 – Peter Hobbs, vocalist and guitarist of Hobbs' Angel of Death, died from undisclosed reasons at the age of 58.
 November 4  – Timi Hansen, former bassist of Mercyful Fate and King Diamond, died from cancer at the age of 61.
 December 28  – Elijah Nelson, bassist of Black Breath, died from undisclosed reasons at the age of 40.

Albums released

January

February

March

April

May

June

July

August

September

October

November

December

References

2010s in heavy metal music
Metal